Shani Kedmi (שני קדמי; born July 20, 1977) is an Israeli former Olympic competitive sailor. She was born in Tel Aviv, Israel, and is Jewish.

Sailing career
Kedmi began competing in sailing at the age of 15.  Her club was Hapoel Tel Aviv. When she participated in the Olympics she was 5-2.5 (160 cm) tall, and weighed 128 lbs (58 kg).

She and Anat Fabrikant placed 8th at the 1995 European Championships in the 470 competition.

Kedmi represented Israel at the 1996 Summer Olympics in Atlanta, Georgia, at the age of 19 in Sailing—Women's Two Person Dinghy 470 event with Fabrikant, and came in 12th.

In 1999, Kedmi and Fabrikant won a silver medal at the Holland Regatta, won a bronze medal representing Israel at the 1999 Summer Universiade, placed 4th at both the European and World Championships, and were ranked No. 2 in the world. In 2000 they finished 6th at the 2000 European Championships.

Kedmi represented Israel at the 2000 Summer Olympics in Sydney, Australia, at the age of 23 in Sailing—Women's Two Person Dinghy 470 event with Fabrikant, and came in 4th, two points behind the bronze medal-winning team from Ukraine.

References

External links
 

1975 births
Living people
Israeli female sailors (sport)
Olympic sailors of Israel
Sailors at the 1996 Summer Olympics – 470
Sailors at the 2000 Summer Olympics – 470
Israeli Jews
Jewish sailors (sport)
People from Tel Aviv